The 2004 Skate America was the first event of six in the 2004–05 ISU Grand Prix of Figure Skating, a senior-level international invitational competition series. It was held at the Mellon Arena in Pittsburgh, Pennsylvania on October 21–24. Medals were awarded in the disciplines of men's singles, ladies' singles, pair skating, and ice dancing. Skaters earned points toward qualifying for the 2004–05 Grand Prix Final. The compulsory dance was the Golden Waltz.

Results

Men

Ladies

Pairs
There was an accident during the free skating. Maxim Marinin lost his balance while attempting a difficult lasso lift and his partner Tatiana Totmianina slammed to the ice head first, sustaining a concussion, but was not seriously hurt. A short while later, Julia Obertas fell out of a lasso lift but her partner Sergei Slavnov managed to catch her to prevent her head hitting the ice.

Ice dancing

References

External links
 2004 Smart Ones Skate America
 http://articles.latimes.com/2004/oct/24/sports/sp-skate24
 http://articles.latimes.com/2004/oct/23/sports/sp-skate23
 http://articles.latimes.com/2004/oct/20/sports/sp-nwirebox20

Skate America, 2004
Skate America